Clevedon is an English seaside town and civil parish in the unitary authority of North Somerset, part of the ceremonial county of Somerset. It recorded a parish population of 21,281 in the United Kingdom Census 2011, estimated at 21,442 in 2019. It lies along the Severn Estuary, among small hills that include Church Hill, Wain's Hill (topped by the remains of an Iron Age hill fort), Dial Hill, Strawberry Hill, Castle Hill, Hangstone Hill and Court Hill, a Site of Special Scientific Interest with overlaid Pleistocene deposits. It features in the Domesday Book of 1086. Clevedon grew in the Victorian period as a seaside resort and in the 20th century as a dormitory town for Bristol.

Facilities and functions
The seafront has ornamental gardens, a Victorian bandstand and other attractions. Salthouse Field has a light railway running round the perimeter and is used for donkey rides in the summer. The shore consists of pebbled beaches and low rocky cliffs, with an old harbour at the western edge of the town, at the mouth of the Land Yeo. The rocky beach has been designated as the Clevedon Shore Geological Site of Special Scientific Interest.

Clevedon Pier, which opened in 1869, is one of the earliest surviving examples of a Victorian pier. On 17 October 1970, two outward spans collapsed when the seventh set of legs from the shore failed during a routine insurance load test. A trust was eventually formed and the pier and its buildings were restored and reopened on 27 May 1989, when the Waverley paddle steamer berthed and took on passengers. Other landmarks include Walton Castle, Clevedon Court, the Clock Tower, and the Curzon Cinema.

Clevedon's light industry is located mainly in industrial estates, including Hither Green Trading Estate near the M5 motorway junction. It is a dormitory town for Bristol. The town is home to educational, religious and cultural buildings and sports clubs.

History

The name derives from the Old English, cleve meaning "cleave" or "cleft" and don meaning "hill".

The hill fort is defined by a steep, natural slope from the south and north with two ramparts to the east.

The 1086 Domesday Book mentions Clevedon as a holding of a tenant-in-chief by the name of Mathew of Mortaigne, with eight villagers and ten smallholders. The parish of Clevedon formed part of the Portbury Hundred.

Two small rivers, the Land Yeo and Middle Yeo, supported at least two mills. The Tuck Mills lay in the fields south of Clevedon Court and were used for fulling cloth. Other mills near Wain's Hill probably date from the early 17th century.

Victorian Clevedon changed from a farming village into a popular seaside town. The Victorian craze for sea bathing was met in the late 19th century by saltwater baths next to the pier (since demolished, though foundations remain), and bathing machines on the main beach.

Clevedon was the site of St Edith's Children's Home for almost 100 years until it closed in 1974. It was run by nuns of the Community of the Sisters of the Church, an international body in the Anglican Communion living according to the Gospel values of poverty, chastity and obedience. The building on Dial Hill is listed, so that the outside has changed little, but now contains private flats.

Clevedon was served by a branch line from  opened in 1847, six years after the main line, but closed in 1966. The station site is now Queen's Square, a shopping precinct. The town was headquarters also for the Weston, Clevedon and Portishead Light Railway, which connected the three named coastal towns. It opened to Weston-super-Mare in 1897, was extended to Portishead ten years later, but closed in 1940. Its trains crossed the road in the town centre, known as The Triangle, preceded by a man with red and green flags.

The first large-scale production of penicillin took place in the town. In 1938 Howard Florey was working at Lincoln College, Oxford University with Ernst Boris Chain and Norman Heatley when he read Alexander Fleming's paper on the antibacterial effects of Penicillium notatum mould. He arranged for this to be grown in deep culture tanks at the Medical Research Council's Antibiotic Research Station in Clevedon, enabling mass production of the mould for a medicine injected into forthcoming World War II soldiers suffering from infections.

Governance
The town has seven electoral wards. Their area and population are the same as mentioned above.

Clevedon falls within the non-metropolitan district of North Somerset unitary authority which replaced the Woodspring district, having formerly been part of Somerset, and between 1974 and 1996 within the county of Avon. Until 2010 the parliamentary constituency was still called Woodspring. Following the review of parliamentary representation by the Boundary Commission for England in Somerset, this seat was renamed North Somerset. It elects one Member of Parliament (MP), currently Dr Liam Fox of the Conservative Party. It was part of the South West England constituency of the European Parliament during the UK's tenure in the European Union.

Geography

Clevedon is situated on and round seven hills called Church Hill, Wain's Hill (topped by the remains of an Iron Age hill fort), Dial Hill, Strawberry Hill, Castle Hill, Hangstone hill and Court Hill, the last a Site of Special Scientific Interest. On a clear day there are far-reaching views across the Severn estuary to Wales. When visibility is good, the islands of Steep Holm and Flat Holm in the Bristol Channel can be seen.

The seafront runs about half a mile from the pier to Salthouse Field, with ornamental gardens, a Victorian bandstand, a bowling green, tennis courts, crazy golf and other amusements. Marine Lake, once a Victorian swimming pool, is used for boating and for a small festival once a year where people can try out new sports. Salthouse Field has a light railway round its perimeter and is used for summer donkey rides.

The shore at Clevedon marries pebbled beaches and low rocky cliffs, with the old harbour at the western edge of the town, at the mouth of the Land Yeo river. There John Ashley conceived of the idea for The Mission to Seafarers. The rocky beach has been designated as Clevedon Shore geological Site of Special Scientific Interest. It is the side of a mineralised fault running east–west adjacent to the pier and forms a small cliff feature in dolomitic conglomerate on the north side of Clevedon Beach, containing cream to pink baryte along with sulphides. Minerals identified include haematite, chalcopyrite, tennantite, galena, tetrahedrite, bornite, pyrite, marcasite, enargite and sphalerite. Secondary alteration of this has produced idaite, Covellite and other Copper sulphides.

"Poets' Walk" is a footpath round Wain's Hill and Church Hill to the south-west of the seafront. The upper town contains many other footpaths through parks and wooded areas laid out in the 19th century. The name recalls poets who visited Clevedon, including Coleridge in 1795 and Tennyson in 1834. The local nature reserve covers Church Hill and Wain's Hill and includes calcareous grassland, coastal scrub and woodland.

Climate

Clevedon, like the rest of South West England, has a temperate climate, generally wetter and milder than the rest of the country. Seasonal temperature variation is less extreme than in most of the United Kingdom due to the adjacent sea temperatures. In the summer, the Azores high pressure affects the south-west of England, but convective cloud sometimes forms inland, reducing the number of hours of sunshine. Annual sunshine rates are slightly less than the regional average of 1,600 hours. Most autumn and winter rainfall results from Atlantic depressions, at their most active in those seasons. In summer, much of the rainfall is caused by the sun heating the ground, leading to convection, showers and thunderstorms. About 8–15 days of snowfall is typical. November to March have the highest mean wind speeds, and June to August the lightest winds. The dominant wind direction is from the south-west.

Demography
The town had a population of 21,957 according to the United Kingdom Census 2001. Of these almost 20 per cent were over the age of 65 years and 98.8 per cent were white. Almost three-quarters of the population described themselves as Christian, with 17.4 per cent having no religion and another 7.3 per cent not stating any religion. Of the 15,408 people between 16 and 74, 72.4 per cent are economically active.

Economy

Clevedon has light industry, mainly on industrial estates such as Hither Green, near the M5 motorway junction. It is also a dormitory town for Bristol. The Clerical Medical pensions and investments group, part of HBOS, was based in the town on the former site of the Hales Cakes factory, but after its closure, North Somerset Council began talks on taking over the lease. Percy Daniel & Co are organ builders, whose work includes that of Brentwood Cathedral.

Yeates Removals was set up in 1910, using horses and carts for general haulage in Clevedon and surrounding areas. The company has always been run by family members.

Landmarks

Clevedon Court is on Court Hill, east of the town centre and close to the Bristol road. It is one of the few remaining 14th-century manorial halls in England, built by Sir John de Clevedon in about 1320. Since the early 18th century, the house has been owned by the Elton family, which did much building work on the house and many improvements in the town. Although the house itself now belongs to the National Trust, the associated estates are still owned by the Elton family. Sir Edmund Elton (1846–1920) was a potter at the Clevedon Elton Sunflower Pottery, who produced unusually shaped ware in richly coloured glazes, including a gold glaze of his own invention.

Walton Castle is a 17th-century fort located on Castle Hill that overlooks the Walton St Mary area at the northern end of Clevedon, built some time between 1615 and 1620. It was designed as a hunting lodge for Lord Poulett, a Somerset MP. The English Civil War saw the decline of Poulett's fortunes, and by 1791 the castle was derelict and being used as a dairy by a local farmer. In 1978, the castle was purchased for £1 by Martin Sessions-Hodge, who restored the building to its former glory.

The Royal Pier Hotel is a Grade II listed building next to the pier. It was built in 1823 by Thomas Hollyman, and originally called The Rock House. In 1868, the building was expanded by the local architect Hans Price and renamed Rock House & Royal Pier Hotel, later shortened to Royal Pier Hotel. After its closure in 2001 the building fell into disrepair, but it has since been converted into luxury apartments.

Clevedon Pier opened on Easter Monday 1869. It is now one of the earliest UK examples of a Victorian pier still in existence. After a set of legs collapsed during an insurance load check on 17 October 1970, it fell into disrepair until 1985, when it was dismantled, taken to Portishead dock for restoration, and rebuilt in 1986. In 2001, it was upgraded to a Grade-1 listed building, The Paddle Steamer Waverley and Motor Vessel Balmoral offer day trips by sea from Clevedon Pier to points along the Bristol Channel and Severn estuary. Adjoining the pier is the contemporary Toll House, built in the style of a folly castle and provided to house the pier-master.

Clevedon clock tower in the town centre is decorated with "Elton ware". It was completed in 1898 and donated by Sir Edmund Elton to mark Queen Victoria's Diamond Jubilee. The Curzon cinema dates from 1912, for Victor Cox, and is one of the world's oldest purpose-built, continuously operated cinemas.

Clevedon Marine Lake opened in 1929. After becoming derelict and disused after the 1960s, it was restored in 2015 with funding from the Heritage Lottery Fund.

The market hall on Alexandra Road was designed by the local architect Hans Price. A monument known as the "Spirit of Clevedon" was erected near the seafront to mark the Millennium. Unveiled in June 2000, the  sculpture cost £9,000. It was designed by local citizens and includes panels and plaques representing the town's history and community. Its base contains a time capsule with information on the town.

Education
Clevedon School is a secondary comprehensive school serving the town and surrounding rural areas, with some 1,200 pupils in years 7 to 11 (Lower School) and 12 to 13 (Upper School or sixth form). It has regained Language College status.

There are six primaries: Mary Elton Primary School, St John the Evangelist of Bath and Wells Academy Trust Church of England School, All Saints C of E Primary School and St Nicholas's Chantry CEVC Primary School.

Mary Elton (née Stewart of Castle Stewart) the second wife of the Reverend Sir Abraham Elton, endowed local schools in the 19th century: the Mary Elton Primary School in Holland Road, Clevedon, is named after her.

St John's the Evangelist Primary School was formerly based on the current site of Clevedon Library. It moved to its current site on the Fosseway in 1991 and was opened by Anne, Princess Royal.

Yeo Moor Primary School, opened on 19 April 2010, amalgamated infant and junior schools that shared the site. The footballer Jack Butland attended Yeo Moor School and Clevedon School.

St Brandon's School was an independent boarding school until 1991 and a co-educational infant and junior school until 2004.

A drama company, Take The Lead, from Clevedon School, has put on productions in the town.

Religious sites

There are several churches serving the town, including St. Andrew's church, built in the 13th century although there are thought to be Saxon foundations under the present building. It is the burial place of Arthur Hallam, subject of the poem In Memoriam A. H. H. by his friend Alfred, Lord Tennyson.

The Church of St John was built in 1876–1878, by William Butterfield for Sir Arthur Elton. The Church of All Saints was built in 1861 by C E Giles. The tower of Christ Church, on Chapel Hill, is an important landmark in Clevedon, erected in 1838–1839 to designs by Thomas Rickman, in an early 14th-century style.

The Copse Road Chapel is an Independent Evangelical Church, built in 1851 and attributed to Foster and Wood of Bristol, which also designed the United Reformed Church in Hill Road. The Roman Catholic Church of the Immaculate Conception is served by the Franciscan order.

Railways

Clevedon was previously served by a branch line from Yatton, which closed in 1966. The site of the town station is now called the Triangle or Queen's Square. The Weston, Clevedon and Portishead Light Railway also served the town.

Sanitation
In 1863, Sir Arthur Elton, 7th Baronet of Clevedon Court was largely responsible for the creation of the Clevedon Waterworks Company, which had built the first water works and sewage treatment works in Clevedon by 1867. Features included reservoirs to the north of Dial Hill and Old Street pumping station. The new site could be seen from Clevedon Court, and the 8th Baronet, Sir Edmund Elton, took exception to the designs of the engineer James Mansergh. The Waterworks Company employed the architect Henry Dare Bryan to improve the appearance of the buildings, which included the pumping station, a coal shed and store, a lodge for the foreman, and the boundary wall and gates. The original pumping station was reused as a fire station. The new pumping station contained a vertical triple-expansion engine manufactured by the Scottish company Glenfield and Kennedy. This was upgraded to a Marshal horizontal compound engine in 1916, in turn replaced in 1938, when a steam turbine was fitted. The boiler house, engine house and chimney are grade II listed, as largely unaltered buildings in Domestic Revival style, with the interior retaining its glazed tiling and elaborate roof trusses, although the machinery has been replaced by modern equipment, and the site is still operational. Clevedon Waterworks Company were one of the first of the smaller waterworks in the region to amalgamate with Bristol Water, which occurred on 1 January 1953.

Sport
The town's location makes water sports a feature. Clevedon Canoe Club at the marine lake facilitates sea paddling trips along the North Somerset coast on the Severn Estuary, and to other sites such as Wye Valley and Woolacombe. Nearby is Clevedon Sailing Club.

Clevedon Cricket Club, founded in 1874, competes in the West of England Premier League. Clevedon Town Football Club dates back to the late 19th century. It was a founder member of the Western Football League, winning its championship in the 1990s. The club plays at Everyone Active Stadium, formerly Hand Stadium. Another Non-League football club, Clevedon United F.C., plays at Coleridge Vale. Swiss Valley Rangers FC, founded in 2000, are a junior football club, based at Clevedon School, that has teams from ages under 6 to ages under 18.

Clevedon Bowling Club, formed in 1910, has gained several international honours. Other facilities include Clevedon Golf Club, with a Par 72, 6,500-yard course, Riding Centre, a Rugby Club, and several others.

Culture

Writers linked with the town include Samuel Taylor Coleridge, who spent some months in a cottage in Clevedon, after his marriage to Sara Fricker, William Makepeace Thackeray, a frequent guest of the Elton family at Clevedon Court, and George Gissing (The Odd Women is set here).

The final scene of a 1993 movie, The Remains of the Day, starring Anthony Hopkins, Emma Thompson and Christopher Reeve, refers to Clevedon, where it was filmed. The television movie Cider with Rosie (1998) also has scenes filmed there. Scenes from the 2010 film, Never Let Me Go, starring Keira Knightley were filmed in Clevedon in the summer of 2009. Clevedon has its comic book superhero, Captain Clevedon.

Clevedon has been twinned with Ettlingen, in Baden-Württemberg, Germany, since 1980, Épernay, France, since 1990, and Middelkerke, Belgium, since 1991.

Clevedon, in particular St Andrew's Church, was one of the settings for the town Broadchurch, a detective drama first aired on ITV on 4 March 2013.

Notable people
In birth order:
Edward Tyson (1651–1708), scientist and physician, is seen as the pioneer of modern comparative anatomy.
Samuel Taylor Coleridge (1772–1834), writer and father of Hartley Coleridge, spent his honeymoon in Clevedon.
Jane Euphemia Saxby, (1811-1898) poet and hymn writer 
Hartley Coleridge (1796–1849), writer and son of Samuel Taylor Coleridge
Arthur Hallam (1811–1833), poet and subject of Tennyson's elegy In Memoriam A.H.H., is buried in Clevedon.
Sir Arthur Elton, 7th Baronet (1818–1884), politician and local benefactor
Emma Jane Guyton (1825–1887, born Worboise), novelist and editor, died in Clevedon.
Frances Freeling Broderip (1830–1878), children's writer, died in Clevedon.
Mortimer Sloper Howell (1841–1925), colonial magistrate and Asiatic scholar
Edward Raymond Turner (1873–1903), an inventor of colour cinema
Sir Arthur Elton, 10th Baronet (1906–1973), pioneer documentary film maker
Jan Morris (1926–2020), author, travel writer and The Times journalist who participated in and announced the first ascent of Everest in 1953
David Bryant (1931–2020), three-times world outdoors singles bowls champion
Graham Tripp (born 1932), county cricketer
Bob Anderson (born 1947), world professional darts champion
Sir Clive Cowdery (born 1963), businessman in insurance and financial services
Brady Haran (born 1976) YouTube video producer, lives in the town.
John Pitts (composer) (born 1976), famed composer and beloved Clevedon School teacher, taught in the town for many years
Kate Reed (born 1982) British Olympic runner (Beijing 2008) 10,000 m
Tuppence Middleton (born 1987), film and TV actress, grew up in Clevedon.
Luke Spiller (born 1988), lead singer and band member of The Struts grew up in Clevedon.
Jack Butland (born 1993), England international and Stoke City football goalkeeper

References

External links

Clevedon Town Council

 
Seaside resorts in England
Towns in North Somerset
Ports and harbours of Somerset
Civil parishes in Somerset
Populated coastal places in Somerset
Beaches of Somerset